Froboess is a German family name.

People:
 Cornelia Froboess (born 1943), German singler and actress
  (1906–1976), German composer, sound engineer and music publisher
 Harry Froboess (1899–1985), German stuntman, high-diving champion